William Carmen "Bill" Chasey (February 11, 1940 - May 23, 2015) was the founder and president of the Foundation for Corporate Social Responsibility (FCSR) in Warsaw, Poland. He was an educator, author, research scientist, inventor, and served as a senior campaign advisor to President Ronald Reagan.

The mission of the FCSR is to mentor senior corporate leaders, giving them skills for developing corporate social responsibility values in their firms.  The primary focus of the FCSR is to serve needy Polish children.  The FCSR's 90 members include CEOs of some of the world's largest and most well-regarded corporations from a diverse and broad range of industry sectors. To date, the FCSR has fed over 5 million meals to needy Polish children, and presently feeds 60,000 meals each month to 3,000 kids in 13 Polish schools.

Chasey founded 6 international MBA programs on behalf of City University of Seattle, and one on behalf of National University in California. He has advised over 150 multi-national companies in international business and corporate philanthropy. Chasey served as an adjunct professor during his years living in Europe, and taught undergraduate and graduate courses in entrepreneurship at Kozminski University in Warsaw, Poland, the Polish Open University in Warsaw, Poland the Warsaw School of Economics in Warsaw, Poland, and the American University in Bulgaria in Sofia, Bulgaria.

Chasey was founder and president of the William Chasey Organization a Washington, D.C. lobbying firm for over twenty-five years. During his lobbying career, Chasey represented some of the world's most prestigious business clients and 23 foreign governments before the United States Congress. He was a Registered Lobbyist with both the Clerk of the United States House of Representatives and the Secretary of the United States Senate as required by the Lobbying Disclosure Act. He was a Registered Foreign Agent, United States Department of Justice. (RFA Number 4221) as required by the Foreign Agents Registration Act. Chasey's professional lobbying ability was captured on film during two episodes of Michael Moore's TV Nation television series in 1994. Because of Chasey's lobbying talents, TV Nation was recognized by the United States Congress by passing Resolution H.J. 365, which declared August 16, 1994 as "TV Nation Day." TV Guide named TV Nation one of the ten best television shows of 1995.

Chasey held the John F. Kennedy Professorship at the Peabody College of Education and Human Development of Vanderbilt University, (Named Academic Professorship funded by the Joseph P. Kennedy Jr. Foundation, Washington, D.C.) Chasey was a research scientist in the Convulsive Disorders Clinic of the Vanderbilt University School of Medicine. He served as a senior scientist in the Institute on Mental Retardation and Intellectual Development (IMRID), and as a senior scientist in the Laboratory of Intrinsic Motivation, and as chairman of the Research Ethics Committee at the Peabody College of Education and Human Development of Vanderbilt University 1972–1975.

Chasey is the author of over 100 research investigations and publications in the field of mental retardation.  He invented 3 research instruments to measure psychomotor learning of mentally retarded children.

Early life and education
Chasey was raised in Trenton, New Jersey, the son of William Carmen Chasey and Hazel Marie Chasey. He grew up in a working-class family and was influenced greatly during his school years by his association with the YMCA and his church. Chasey's father was a graduate of Massanutten Military Academy in Woodstock, Virginia. He made his living in sales and ended his career as a sales representative for a large milk company in New Jersey.

Chasey attended public schools in Trenton, New Jersey, and graduated from Pennsbury High School in Yardley, Pennsylvania. He received his B.S. degree in physical education from Springfield College (Massachusetts) in 1962, where he was a member of the gymnastics and track teams. He was vice president of his graduating class, and was elected senior class graduation marshal.

Chasey received his M.A. degree in education from East Carolina University in 1965 while serving as a Marine Corps Officer at the Marine Corps Base Camp Lejeune, North Carolina. He was elected a member of Phi Delta Kappa, the National Honorary Education Fraternity.

Chasey received his Ph.D. degree from the University of Maryland in 1969 while serving as an instructor at the university. His academic concentration was the psychomotor development of mentally retarded children.

Chasey was awarded an LH.D, Doctor of Humane Letters, (honoris causa) Literarum Humanarum Doctor, Honorary Doctorate, (Humanitarian Excellence), from National University (California) in 1985 for his work in lobbying the Central American Peace Plan through the US Congress.

Personal life
Chasey was married to Virginia Chasey, his wife of 33 years. He had two daughters, Cherie and Christie, from a previous marriage. He and Virginia had one daughter Katie. Virginia Chasey served with her husband on the Management Board of the Foundation for Corporate Social Responsibility.

Late in his life, Chasey contracted multiple myeloma and leukemia. After contending with his illness for six years, he died in San Diego, California and was interred at Miramar National Cemetery.

Military service
Chasey joined the United States Marine Corps in 1958 during his freshman year in college. He trained during his college summers to become a Marine Corps Officer at the Marine Base in Quantico, Virginia. Upon his graduation from college, he was commissioned a second lieutenant and attended the Officers Basic School at the Quantico Marine Base, from June, 1962 to December 1962. He graduated with a Military Occupational Specialty of Infantry Officer (0302) United States military occupation code.
Chasey served as an infantry platoon commander, with the 2nd Anti-Tank Battalion, Second Marine Division, at Camp Lejeune, North Carolina. He deployed to the Caribbean in 1963 with the 3rd Battalion, 6th Marine Regiment as part of Battalion Landing Team 3/6. In 1964, he was transferred to the 2nd Marine Division Headquarters to organize and direct the All-Marine Corps Boxing Championships. He was promoted to the rank of 1st lieutenant in 1963. He attended a variety of Marine Corps schools including: the Marine Corps Officers Basic School, Nuclear-Biological-Chemical Warfare School, Cold Weather Survival School, Escape and Evasion School, and the Explosive Ordnance School.

Chasey was awarded the National Defense Service Medal for honorable active military service during the time of war or conflict as a member of the United States Armed Forces, (Vietnam War Period).

He received an honorable discharge in May 1965.

Political campaigns 
During 1979-80, Chasey served as director of domestic policy for John B. Connally's presidential campaign. He was a traveling advisor to Gov. Connally in presidential primary and caucus states. When Governor Connally withdrew from the race, Chasey became a principal advisor to the 1980 presidential campaign of Ronald Reagan and George H. W. Bush.

Chasey created and directed the first nationwide Christian voter registration program for Candidate Ronald Reagan. He helped write all of Reagan's campaign position statements and speeches for church groups and religious organizations. He helped select Reagan's campaign appearances and accompanied him to all religious events during the campaign. He arranged meetings for candidate Reagan with major church and evangelical leaders throughout the country.

He was a key fundraiser for the 1988 presidential campaign of George H. W. Bush. Over the course of 25 years as a Washington lobbyist, Chasey advised and raised campaign funds for numerous campaigns for governor, House of Representatives and the United States Senate.

Philanthropy 

Chasey was a founder of the Cause Marketing concept, and he continued to be a leading proponent of Cause Related Marketing throughout the Globe. He either created, consulted with, or directed 19 different NGOs and/or charities during his career. He consulted and advised 23 National Red Cross Societies throughout the world, and served for over 3 years as principal consultant to the Polish Red Cross, where he created a major cause related marketing campaign called the "Care Partners Network."  With the financial support of the American Red Cross in Southeast Europe, Chasey served for three-years as a Cause Marketing Consultant to the Bulgarian Red Cross in the development of a "Care Partners Network," which still provides hot meals to poor Bulgarian children each school day.

He has received numerous national and international awards, including an Honorary Doctor of Humane Letters (LH.D) from National University (California) for his lobbying efforts for the Central American Peace Plan, Esquipulas Peace Agreement, on behalf of Nobel Peace Laureate, President Oscar Arias of Costa Rica, author of the plan. 
 
Chasey and his wife Virginia, founded the Third World Prosthetic Foundation. They were honored by President Cristiani of El Salvador for their work on behalf of the war-torn country's amputee population of soldiers and children. They provided over 1,000 prosthetic devices to land mine victims.

Author 
Chasey's first two successful non-fiction books, Foreign Agent 4221, and Pan Am 103, the Lockerbie Cover-up, drawn from personal experience, tell the story of Chasey's attempt to normalize relations between the U.S. and Libya over the bombing of Pan Am 103 over Lockerbie, Scotland in 1988. He concludes that the PanAm bombing was wrongfully attributed to the Muammar Gaddafi government and was, in fact, the work of Syria and Iran in response to the USS Vincennes incident.
 
'Truth Never Dies: The Bill Chasey Story,' Chasey's third book, was a 2012 Pulitzer Prize in Literature entrant, and is also drawn from personal experience. It tells of his efforts to help normalize relations between the U.S. and the Government of Libya.

Screenplay 
Chasey's book, "Truth Never Dies" (Screen Title: Influence) is in pre-production. The screenplay was written by John Brancato, Michael Ferris and Dr. Chasey. The film is being produced by Richard Middleton, Andrew Lazar and Dr. Chasey.

Inventions 
Chasey invented a Stabilometer Computerized Analog Recording System (SCARS), through a grant from the Joseph P. Kennedy Jr. Foundation in 1974. He invented a Serial Stacker for Measuring Gross Motor Learning by Young Retarded Children, through a Biomedical Research Grant, from the National Institutes of Health in 1973. Chasey, along with James Hogge, invented, A Curve Smoothing Program for Plotting a Predictive Value for a Polynomial Fitted for an IBM 1130 Computer, through a grant from the Joseph P. Kennedy Jr. Foundation in 1974.

Selected research articles 
 Chasey, W.C. and Wyrick, W. Effects of a gross motor development program on form perception skills of educable mentally retarded children. Research Quarterly, 1970, 41,345-351.
 Chasey, W.C. Motor skill development effects on learning by retarded children. Mental Retardation, 1970, 65, 121-123.
 Chasey, W.C. A clinical approach to motor development for retarded children. Mental Retardation, 1970, 65, 23-27.
 Chasey, W.C. and Wyrick, W. Effects of a physical developmental program on psychomotor ability of retarded children. American Journal of Mental Deficiency, 1971, 75, 124-133.
 Chasey, W.C. Affective learning through a psychomotor program for retarded children. Research Quarterly, 1971, 42, 96-98.
 Chasey, W.C. Overlearning as a variable in the retention of gross motor skills by the mentally retarded. Research Quarterly, 1971, 42, 145-149.
 Chasey, W.C. and Knowles, C.S. Effects of gross motor skill overlearning on retention by mentally retarded males. Perceptual and Motor Skills, 1973, 36, 503-509.
 Chasey, W.C., Swartz, J. and Chasey, C.A. Effect of motor development on body image scores in institutionalized mentally retarded children. American Journal of Mental Deficiency. 1974, 78, 440-445.
 Swartz, J. and Chasey, W.C. Motor development and body image: A reply to Ball. American Journal of Mental Deficiency, 1974, 79,227-228.
 Chasey, W.C., Barth, J., Cini, A., Martin, H., and Pupke, W. A computerized analog recording system for the stabilometer. Behavior Research Methods and Instrumentation, 1975, Vol. 7 (6), 553-556.
 Chasey, W.C. and Chasey, C.A. Effect of a physical developmental program on the self-concept of trainable mentally retarded children. American Journal of Mental Deficiency, 1975, 79, 380-383.
 Chasey, W.C. Distribution of practice effects on learning, retention and relearning by retarded boys. Perceptual and Motor Skills, 1976, 43, 159-164.
 Chasey, W.C., Barth, J., Cini, A., Martin, H., and Pupke, W. A stabilometer computerized analog recording system for measuring motor learning. Research Quarterly, 1976, Vol. 47, 524-525.
 Chasey, W.C. Motor skill overlearning effects on retention and relearning by retarded boys. Research Quarterly, March, 1977, Vol. 48, 41-46.
 Chasey, W.C., Haywood, H.C., and Tzuriel, D. Effects of various stimuli on activity level and learning by high and low active retarded children. Research Quarterly, May, 1977, Vol. 48, No. 2, 265-269.

Academic honors and awards 
 Listed in "The Compendium Persons of Eminence in the Field of Exceptional Children."
 Listed in "Who's Who in American Education."
 Fellow, American Academy of Mental Retardation.
 Fellow, American Academy of Sports Medicine.
 Fellow, American Academy of Sports Psychology.
 Fellow, Council for Exceptional Children.
 Advisor, Presidential Commission on Olympic Sports
 Advisor, President's Council on Fitness, Sports, and Nutrition
 Delegate, White House Conference on the Handicapped
 Awarded the Bulgarian Red Cross "Gold Medal of Honor" for creating and directing a National Care Partners Network for Bulgaria.
 Awarded the "Child's Friend" award in 2006. For 60 years, this honorary medal has been awarded to individuals and institutions involved in social work for the benefit of children in the Republic of Poland.

Other qualifications 
Chasey had a Commercial Pilot License, Multi-Engine Rating, and Instrument Rating from the Federal Aviation Administration of the United States Department of Transportation. He had approximately 2,000 hours as pilot in command.

References

External links

Truth Never Dies
Foundation for Corporate Social Responsibility

1940 births
2015 deaths
Deaths from multiple myeloma
Springfield College (Massachusetts) alumni
United States Marine Corps officers
East Carolina University alumni
University System of Maryland alumni
Writers from Trenton, New Jersey
Deaths from cancer in California
Burials at Miramar National Cemetery
Military personnel from New Jersey